Comeback Kid is a Canadian hardcore punk band formed in March 2001 in Winnipeg, Manitoba. The band currently consists of vocalist Andrew Neufeld, guitarists Jeremy Hiebert and Stu Ross, bassist Chase Brenneman and drummer Loren Legare. Since its formation, the band have released seven studio albums and seventeen music videos. Their seventh studio album, Heavy Steps, was released in January 2022.

History

The band was formed in March 2001, by Andrew Neufeld and Jeremy Hiebert who were both members of the band Figure Four, joined by their friends Scott Wade and Kyle Profeta, originally intended only to be a side project. The band's name, originally "The Comeback Kid", comes from a headline in a newspaper about hockey player Mario Lemieux coming back to the NHL. The band released a six-song demo in January 2002 and in August 2002 was signed to Facedown Records.

Upon releasing Turn It Around on Facedown Records in 2003, Comeback Kid began touring full-time, covering most of North America as well as Europe. They also appeared on many high-profile hardcore punk festivals like Hellfest and Posi Numbers festival. Following the touring for Turn it Around, Comeback Kid entered the Blasting Room in Fort Collins, Colorado to begin recording their second album.

In February 2005 Comeback Kid released Wake the Dead, their first for Victory Records. After some long tours, vocalist Scott Wade left the band. Neufeld became the band's vocalist, and they began recording their third album Broadcasting. The release of Broadcasting was followed by more steady touring, culminating with a summer long tour supporting Rise Against in North America, and their first appearance on the "Never Say Die" tour in Europe with Parkway Drive. By the end of 2007 the band was to take a short hiatus. At this time bass player Kevin Call left the band on good terms, issuing a statement regarding leaving Comeback Kid.

Call was replaced by Matt Keil who had played in Minneapolis area bands with Hjelmberg. Two more years of touring followed, with the band visiting South East Asia and Latin America for the first times.

In 2008 a CD/DVD was released called Through The Noise which is a line from the song "Industry Standards" off of "Broadcasting...". The DVD is a documentary of the first 6 years of Comeback Kid. The CD is a live recording of a show in Leipzig, Germany filmed in fall 2007. A release tour in Canada followed, named the "Through the Noise Tour." It featured Bane, Misery Signals, Shai Hulud, Grave Maker, and Outbreak. While on this tour Gravemaker suffered a van accident with Neufeld in the vehicle, which inspired the song "G.M. Vincent and I" off 2010's "Symptoms and Cures."

After two years of international touring, the band spent much of 2010 writing and recording their fourth studio album,Symptoms and Cures which was released in Canada by Distort Entertainment and internationally by Victory Records. Two more installments of the "Through the Noise" tour followed in North America and Europe.

In early 2012 guitarist Casey Hjelmberg announced he would be leaving the band. Stu Ross of Misery Signals/Living with Lions will assume guitar duties.

On September 21, 2013, Comeback Kid stated on their Facebook page that they had started recording a new full-length album. Die Knowing, the band's fifth studio album, was released on March 4, 2014, through Victory Records.

On May 13, 2014, drummer and founding member Kyle Profeta announced his departure from the band, to focus on his culinary skills in South Africa.

On September 8, 2017, Comeback Kid released their sixth studio album Outsider via Nuclear Blast.

In April 2019, the ensemble plans to travel Europe with American rock bands Sharptooth, No Turning Back and Jesus Piece.

Two Comeback Kid songs, "Didn't Even Mind" and "Die Knowing", made a guest appearance in the 2016 novel Devaneio by Brazilian writer Augusto de Brito.

Their seventh studio album, Heavy Steps, was released on January 21, 2022, via New Damage in Canada and Nuclear Blast worldwide.

Members 

 Current
 Andrew Neufeld – lead vocals (2006–present), rhythm guitar, backing vocals (2001–2006)
 Jeremy Hiebert – lead guitar, backing vocals (2001–present)
 Stu Ross – rhythm guitar, backing vocals (2012–present) 
 Loren Legare – drums (2015–present)
 Chase Brenneman – bass,  backing vocals (2021–present, touring 2018–2021)

 Former
 Cliff Heide – bass (2002–2003)
 Scott Wade – lead vocals (2001–2006)
 Kevin Call – bass (2003–2007)
 Casey Hjelmberg – rhythm guitar (2006–2012)
 Kyle Profeta – drums (2001–2014)
 Matt Keil – bass, backing vocals (2008–2014)
 Jesse Labovitz – drums (2014–2015)
 Ron Friesen – bass, backing vocals (2014–2018)

 Touring
 Joel Neufeld – drums (sporadically)

 Timeline

Discography

Studio albums

Videography
"Die Tonight"
"Wake The Dead"
"Broadcasting..."
"Defeated"
"False Idols Fall" (live in Leipzig in 2008)
"Because of All"
"G.M. Vincent & I"
"The Concept Stays"
"Do Yourself a Favor"
"Should Know Better"
"Wasted Arrows"
"Didn't Even Mind"
"Surrender Control"
"Hell Of A Scene"
"No Easy Way Out"
"Heavy Steps"
"Crossed" (featuring Joe Duplantier of Gojira)

References

External links
Official website
 Simula, Collin. . HM Magazine

Canadian hardcore punk groups
Melodic hardcore groups
Musical groups established in 2001
Musical groups from Winnipeg
Victory Records artists
Musical quintets
2001 establishments in Manitoba
Mennonite musicians